Oklahoma City lies in a temperate humid subtropical climate (Köppen: Cfa), with frequent variations in weather daily and seasonally, except during the consistently hot and humid summer months. Consistent winds, usually from the south or south-southeast during the summer, help temper the hotter weather. Consistent northerly winds during the winter can intensify cold periods. Oklahoma City's climate transitions toward semi-arid further to the west, toward humid continental to the north, and toward humid subtropical to the east and southeast. The sun shines about 69% of the time, with monthly percent possible sunshine ranging from 60% in December to 80% in July.

Winter
Winters are typically cool, relatively dry, and somewhat brief, albeit highly variable. The last reading  or colder occurred on February 18, 2021.

Spring
In spring (March to early June), Oklahoma City lies in a zone of frequent conflict between warm, moist air from the Gulf of Mexico and cold, dry air from Canada.  Furthermore, the "dryline," separating hot, dry air from Mexico and the southwestern U.S. from warm, moist air from the Gulf of Mexico, often spawns strong to severe thunderstorms across central Oklahoma.  Accordingly, precipitation sees a marked uptick in spring, not uncommonly accompanied by severe weather, including severe thunderstorms, large hail, and tornadoes, especially from mid-April to early June, with May the highest-risk month.  Oklahoma City, and central Oklahoma generally, is one of the most tornado-prone places in the world.

The average date of the last spring freeze is March 29, while the first  of summer can be expected on May 6.

Summer
Summers are very hot and rather humid, but from mid-June onward, are relatively dry, with less-severe and less-frequent showers and thunderstorms compared to the late-April to early-June period. In many years, long stretches of hot, dry weather, punctuated by occasional shower/thunderstorm activity, predominate.

Autumn
On average, Oklahoma City experiences a secondary peak in precipitation in September and October, compared to the heat and dryness of July and August. Temperatures cool off quickly in the autumn, especially in November, but daytime temperatures can be warm (80s to low 90s) into mid-October. The last  of the warm season can be expected on September 26, and the average date of the first freeze in autumn is November 6.

Severe weather
Oklahoma City has a very active severe weather season from March through June, especially during April and May. Located in the center of a region colloquially known as Tornado Alley, Oklahoma City is prone to especially frequent and severe tornadoes, as well as very severe hailstorms and occasional derechoes. Tornadoes have occurred in every month of the year in Oklahoma City, and a secondary smaller peak also occurs during the early autumn, especially in mid-September to late-October. The Oklahoma City metropolitan area is one of the most tornado-prone major cities in the world, with about 150 tornadoes striking within the city limits since 1890. Since the time weather records have been kept, Oklahoma City has been struck by thirteen violent tornadoes, eleven F/EF4's and two F/EF5's.

Statistics

See also 
 Climate of Oklahoma

Notes

References

External links 
 http://www.city-data.com/us-cities/The-South/Oklahoma-City-Geography-and-Climate.html
 http://www.rssweather.com/climate/Oklahoma/Oklahoma%20City/
 http://okc.about.com/od/forthehome/ht/oktornadotips.htm
 Website of the Weather Forecast Office responsible for Oklahoma City

Oklahoma City
Oklahoma City